Columb 'Collie' Thomas Knox (1899–1977) was a British writer and journalist active during World War II and the 1950s.  After a varied military career, he joined the Daily Express before switching to the Daily Mail, which promoted him as a star journalist. 

In 1994 he married Gwendoline Frances Mary Mitchell, but they divorced in 1948.

For a time he shared a flat in Brighton with landscape designer Peter Coats, and together with Sir David Webster, Robin Maugham, Douglas Byng, and others, became slightly notorious as one of that town's homosexual celebrities.

Books 

Collie Knox Calling! A Selection of the famous Friday "Week-end" broadcasts now appearing in the Daily Mail, Chapman and Hall, (1937)
Collie Knox Again,  Chapman and Hall, (1938). 
It Might Have Been You, Chapman & Hall, (1939). 
Heroes All, Hodder & Stoughton, (1941). 
Atlantic Battle (1941).
It had to be me , Methuen & Co., (1947).
The Un-Beaten Track, Cassell and Company, (1944).

References

British male journalists
1899 births
1977 deaths
Daily Mail journalists